The 1999–2000 FIG Rhythmic Gymnastics World Cup series was a series of stages where events in rhythmic gymnastics were contested. The series consisted of a two-year long competition, culminating at a final event — the World Cup Final in 2000. A number of qualifier stages were held. The top 3 gymnasts in each apparatus at the qualifier events would receive medals and prize money. Gymnasts that finished in the top 8 also received points which were added up to a ranking that qualified for the biennial World Cup Final.

Stages
Besides specific World Cup stages, the 1999 World Championships was also part of the 1999–2000 World Cup series. Even though some stages distributed only a single set of medals after the all-around event, all of the stages awarded points valid for each different apparatus.

Medalists

All-around

Rope

Hoop

Ball

Ribbon

See also
 1999–2000 FIG Artistic Gymnastics World Cup series

References

Rhythmic Gymnastics World Cup
1999 in gymnastics
2000 in gymnastics